De Bijenkorf (literally, "the beehive") is a chain of high-end department stores in the Netherlands, with its flagship store on Dam Square in Amsterdam. The chain is owned by Selfridges Group, which also owns Britain's Selfridges and Ireland's Brown Thomas and Arnotts.

It has been a member of the International Association of Department Stores from 1929 to 2012, with various CEOs acting as presidents of the Association over time.

History

 

De Bijenkorf was founded in 1870 by Simon Philip Goudsmit (1845-1889), starting as a small haberdashery shop at 132 Nieuwendijk, one of Amsterdam's oldest streets. Initially limited to yarn and ribbons, and employing a staff of four, the stock expanded gradually. After the death of Goudsmit in 1889, Goudsmit's widow expanded the business with the help of a cousin, Arthur Isaac, and her son Alfred, eventually buying adjacent buildings.

In 1909, these connecting shops were replaced by a new building. That same year, a temporary building was erected on the site of the demolished Beurs van Zocher, and construction of a new store started beside it.

 
In 1926, a second store was constructed in The Hague. It was designed by architect Piet Kramer and stands as an example of Amsterdam School architecture.

A third store opened in Rotterdam in 1930, designed by Willem Dudok. Some 700,000 people attended the ceremony. The store was heavily damaged in the Rotterdam Blitz of 1940. The intact part of the store remained open for business until 1957, but was cleared in 1960 to build the Rotterdam Metro. A new store was designed by Hungarian-American architect Marcel Breuer (1902–1981).

During the occupation of Amsterdam by the Nazis, they did not want their soldiers shopping at De Bijenkorf due to it being a "Jewish enterprise". During the later 20th century, it was owned by the Maxeda group.

As of 2014, de Bijenkorf has 7 stores nationwide. The oldest and largest branches, situated in Amsterdam, The Hague and Rotterdam, have retail space ranging between 15,000 and 21,000 square meters. Smaller stores (7,500-10,000 m2 of retail space) can be found in Amstelveen, Eindhoven, Utrecht and Maastricht.

Branches in Arnhem, Groningen, Enschede, Breda and Den Bosch closed in late 2014/early 2015 as the parent group decided to focus up-market and online due to the new premium service strategy. The Arnhem building was taken over by Primark, a move seen by many Arnhemers as drastically reducing the attractiveness of Arnhem as a shopping centre.

References

External links

Dam Square
Retail companies established in 1870
Department stores of the Netherlands
Retail companies of the Netherlands